Frank Weston Benson made Waterscapes in oil, watercolor, ink, pencil and created etchings. He also made portraits, landscapes, wildlife, interiors and other works of art.

Salem Harbor was Benson's first etching, made while he was at the School of the Museum of Fine Arts, Boston and published in the school's magazine Students in the School of Drawing. Benson was one of the editors of the magazine. Thirty years later, in 1912, Benson began etching again, a practice that thereafter became a major body of his work. Two plates were made of The Anchorage that depicted a fisherman bringing a dory to shore. The first resulted in 48 proofs on shogun paper, 43 of which were signed. The second plate was more spacious than the first and resulted in 25 signed proofs printed on shogun paper. The work was exhibited in 1915 and 1916 four times. Casting for Salmon is one of Benson's 359 etchings, most of which were made of waterfowl. In the simple composition of a fisherman reflected influence by Japanese artists and demonstrated his skill as an etcher.

Benson declared Calm Morning of his three oldest children his "best out of door work." In this case Benson was deliberate in his approach, he made three oil studies before making the final painting; Generally he started and finished he outdoor paintings on one canvas. From left to right, Eleanor, Elisabeth and George fished over the side of a boat off in the waters of their summer home in Maine. Benson was masterful in capturing the reflection of the boat on the water and the deeper color of its shadow. The vivid, luminous colors give depict the sun shining upon the children.

Over Benson's career he painted more than 600 watercolors, like Camp (or Salmon Fishing) that he made during a salmon fishing trip in Canada with his son, George.

Waterscapes

Notes

References

Bibliography

External links

Frank Weston Benson
Water in art
Ships in art